The following is a discography of singles and albums released by the British-American singer Sinitta.

Albums

Studio albums

Compilation albums
1998: The Best of Sinitta (Pegasus)
1999: The Very Best of...Sinitta/Toy Boy (Pegasus)
2009: The Hits+ Collection 86–09: Right Back Where We Started From (Cherry Pop/PMG Music/Sony Music)
2010: Greatest Hits + Bonus DVD (Cherry Pop/Sony Music)

Singles

As lead artist

Notes

Collaborations
1983: "Break Me Into Little Pieces" (with Hot Gossip)
1983: "Don't Beat Around the Bush" (with Hot Gossip)
1986: "Give Give Give" (with Dance Aid) – UK No. 85, BEL (Fla) No. 33
1988: "A Place in the Sun" (with Winjama)
1990: "Bridge Over Troubled Water" (with The Session)
1997: "You Can Do Magic" (credited as The Mojams featuring Debbie Currie; but using Sinitta's vocals)

References

Discographies of American artists
Discographies of British artists
Pop music discographies